Bai Yu may refer to:

 Bai Yu (actor) (白宇; born 1990), Chinese actor
 Bai Yu (actress) (白羽), Chinese producer, actress, and director